Rebecca Elise Lamb (born 27 March 1986), known professionally as Elise Lamb, is an Australian actress, dancer, writer, director and producer of theatre and film. Lamb is a graduate of the prestigious Royal Central School of Speech and Drama and is known for her extensive stage work including her portrayal of Zelda Fitzgerald in the Australian premiere of William Luce's one-woman play The Last Flapper. She is a recipient of the  Ian Potter Cultural Trust Award and her screenplay for The Australian Girl was nominated for the Australian Writers' Guild Monte Miller Award.

Early life and education 
Lamb was born and raised in Brisbane, Australia. She studied classical ballet through the Royal Academy of Dance from the age of 3 and studied Musical Theatre at the Australian Dance Performance Institute. When Lamb was 15 years old she was chosen to dance for Australian vocal artist Vanessa Amorosi and girl group Bardot at the Opening Gala of the 2001 Goodwill Games. She graduated from Canterbury College in 2003 where she studied drama and music and performed in the school's production of Guys and Dolls.

She trained as an actor at the National Institute of Dramatic Art (NIDA) in Sydney and studied Classical acting (Shakespeare) at the London Academy of Music and Dramatic Art (LAMDA). 

In 2016, Lamb graduated from the Royal Central School of Speech and Drama with a Master's Degree in Advanced Theatre Practice.

In 2019, Lamb graduated from the Griffith Film School with a Graduate Certificate in Screen Production specialising in Scriptwriting.

Career

Acting
Lamb began her professional career at the age of 17 when she was employed as a cast member at Warner Bros. Movie World on the Gold Coast, Australia. There she spent her first 5 years out of high school portraying numerous roles including DC Comics hero Batgirl,  The Justice League 's Hawkgirl, Shrek 's Princess Fiona, Scooby-Doo 's Daphne Blake and was a dancer in the Looney Tunes Musical Review. She was the youngest performer to present the Movie Magic Special Effects Show and was a member of its closing cast in 2005. She also performed in the Police Academy Stunt Show and was an original cast member of the Scooby-Doo Disco Detectives.

In 2007, Lamb danced with The Australian Ballet for their Brisbane season of  Don Quixote at QPAC and performed in Rodgers and Hammerstein's  Carousel at the Twelfth Night Theatre.

In 2008, Lamb relocated to Osaka, Japan for 2 years to work for Universal Studios Japan where she reprised her role as Princess Fiona, impersonated Marilyn Monroe, originated the role of Cinderella in the Magical Starlight Parade (IAAPA Big E Award "Best Overall Production"), danced as a Rockette in the annual Christmas Parade and performed the roles of Wendy and Jane in the Thea (Themed Entertainment Association) Award-winning  Peter Pan's Neverland.

After completing her training at NIDA in 2012, Lamb appeared in numerous independent Australian films including The Pale Moonlight opposite Matt Boesenberg and Blown for Tropfest which she also wrote, directed and produced. She also appeared as Juliet in Romeo and Juliet for the Queensland Theatre Company.

In 2014, she starred as Zelda Fitzgerald in William Luce's one-woman play The Last Flapper at Brisbane Arts Theatre.

In 2015, Lamb played Katherina in The Taming of the Shrew for Phoenix Ensemble and reprised her role as Zelda Fitzgerald in The Last Flapper for Brisbane Fringe Festival. In December 2015, she was awarded the  Ian Potter Cultural Trust Award, a professional development grant for emerging Australian artists which allowed her to study at the Royal Central School of Speech and Drama.

After graduating from Central in 2016, Lamb secured small roles in The Crown and feature films Stan and Ollie and All the Money in the World. She was also featured in a Commercial for Cadbury with fellow Australian Jesinta Franklin. Lamb performed in new writing at Off West End theatres Arcola Theatre, Theatre N16, Pleasance Theatre, The Vaults, Leicester Square Theatre and Battersea Arts Centre. She also played WWI Correspondent Louise Mack in her debut play The Australian Girl and Australian Suffragette Muriel Matters in her short play "Deeds, Not Words".

In 2022, she played Lee in Marvin's Room by Scott McPherson at Ad Astra.

Directing

Lamb directed her debut short film Blown for Tropfest in 2012. Lamb was a trainee director at the Brisbane Arts Theatre from 2014 to 2015. She had her theatre directorial debut with their 2015 season opener The Complete Works of William Shakespeare (Abridged) and was the assistant director for their 1000th production Noises Off. In 2015, she also directed Elvis Is Dead by Canadian playwright James Hutchison for the Short & Sweet Theatre Festival at The Arts Centre Gold Coast. Lamb was a member of the Young Vic Directors Program (2016-2018).

Lamb's 2019 Griffith Film School Thesis Film Method In Madness which she wrote, directed and produced, stars Ted Lasso'''s Cristo Fernández as Hamlet and was a Finalist in Kenneth Branagh's Shakespeare Shorts and Won "Best Director" and "Best Cinematography" at the Paris International Film Awards.

Writing

In 2012, Lamb wrote her debut short film Blown for Tropfest and See You Soon. Whilst a student at the Royal Central School of Speech and Drama, Lamb began writing her debut play The Australian Girl, inspired by the life of Louise Mack, the first female war correspondent during World War I. Central funded research and development in Belgium for the play and the first draft was presented in a semi-staged reading at LOST Theatre in London during the summer of 2016. In 2017, The Australian Girl received further support from the Old Vic New Voices and a full length version of the play premiered Off West End at Theatre N16 as part of their Military Season Aftershock. Her short play A Dance Of Two Sisters about two Polish sisters during World War II was presented at the Pleasance Theatre. In 2018, her second short play Deeds, Not Words about Australian Suffragette Muriel Matters was also presented at the Pleasance Theatre. Lamb was a member of the National Theatre's Writers Group (2018) and was an Associate Artist of Theatre 1880 (2016-2018).

In 2020, Lamb began adapting her stage play The Australian Girl for screen. The short Proof of Concept script was Runner-Up "Best Unproduced Short Screenplay" at the Oscar-qualifying Raindance Film Festival and Won "Best Short Screenplay" and the "Grand Jury Prize" at the Female Voices Rock Film Festival in New York. In 2022, she was award the Raindance Screenwriting Fellowship'' to develop a long-form project.

Personal life 
There was already a Rebecca Lamb registered with Spotlight and Equity, as a result Lamb changed her name professionally to "Elise Lamb". She was previously credited as "Rebecca Elise Lamb".

Lamb is related to British actor Michael Rennie. Although born in Australia, Lamb has Scottish, Irish, English, French and Norwegian ancestry.

Filmography

Acting credits

Film

Television

Commercial

Music video

Director, writer and producer credits

Film

Theatre

Acting credits

Director credits

Writer credits

Producer credits

Awards and nominations

References

External links 
 

Living people
Australian film actresses
Australian producers
Australian directors
1986 births
Alumni of the Royal Central School of Speech and Drama
Alumni of the London Academy of Music and Dramatic Art